Shirley Marie O'Garra (stage name Shirley Ellis, married name Shirley Elliston; January 19, 1929 – October 5, 2005) was an American soul music singer and songwriter of West Indian heritage. She is best known for her novelty hits "The Nitty Gritty" (1963, US no. 8), "The Name Game" (1964, US no. 3) and "The Clapping Song" (1965, US no. 8 and UK no. 6). "The Clapping Song" sold over one million copies and was awarded a gold disc.

Career
By 1954, Ellis had written two songs recorded by the Chords. She was originally in the group the Metronomes and married the lead singer, Alphonso Elliston. All her solo hits were written by her and her manager, record producer, and songwriting partner Lincoln Chase.

Ellis had recording contracts with the Kapp Records subsidiary Congress and later Columbia and Bell, but retired from the music industry in 1968.

In August 2020, "The Clapping Song" was used in a TV commercial for the Samsung Galaxy Tab 7, and in April 2021 her "I See It, I Like It, I Want It" was in another Samsung commercial, this time for the Galaxy Z Flip 5G and Galaxy Z Fold2.  In 2021, "The Clapping Song" was used in the movie "Ghostbusters: Afterlife".

Personal life
Shirley O'Garra was born to William H. and Petra (Smith) O'Garra. Her father was a native of Montserrat, and her mother was born in the Bahamas. Shirley had three full siblings, Joyce, Bertram and William Jr., and four half siblings, Reginald, Suzanne, Joycelyn and Berbian. O'Garra married her husband, Arnold Alphonso Elliston (October 21, 1929 – August 23, 2009; professional name: Alphonso Elliston), in Florida on August 3, 1949. She died on October 5, 2005 in New York City at the age of 76.

Cover versions
Cover versions of her hits have been recorded by Madeline Bell, the Belle Stars, Laura Branigan, Aaron Carter, Gary Glitter, Ricardo Ray, Pia Zadora, Southern Culture on the Skids, Gladys Knight & the Pips (a version of "The Nitty Gritty", produced by Norman Whitfield), and Divine,  Harris Glenn Milstead (a hi-NRG version of "The Name Game"). In addition, her song "Soul Time" was sampled by the UK band the Go! Team for their single "Bottle Rocket". In 2011, “The Name Game” was covered by Jessica Lange and the cast of American Horror Story: Asylum and was featured in the episode of the same name.

Discography

Studio albums
In Action (1964, Congress)
The Name Game (1965, Congress)
Sugar, Let's Shing-a-Ling (1967, Columbia)

Compilation albums
The Name Game (1988, MCA Special Products)
The Very Best of Shirley Ellis (1995, Taragon)
The Complete Congress Recordings (2001, Connoisseur Collection)
Three Six Nine!: The Best of Shirley Ellis (2018, Ace)

Singles

References

External links
Shirley Ellis Three Six Nine! The Name Game/Soul Time Home Page

Fansite biography
Biography and full discography

1929 births
2005 deaths
American people of Bahamian descent
American people of Montserratian descent
American people of West Indian descent
American soul musicians
American rhythm and blues singers
People from the Bronx
Songwriters from New York (state)
20th-century American singers
Kapp Records artists
20th-century American women singers
21st-century American women